Raheens  is a Gaelic football club based in Caragh, County Kildare, Ireland, winner of the Leinster senior club championship in 1981, 10 county senior football championships, first winners of the Kildare club of the year in 1973 and winners again in 1976. The separate hurling club, formerly known as Éire Óg, has now amalgamated to become Éire Óg-Corrachoill.

History
Raheens won the first of ten Kildare titles in 1935 with a massive 6-3 to 1-0 win over Kildare St. Brigid's. They won their second in 1936. They climbed back onto the winner's podium with the help of Pat Dunny in 1964. A 1981 win led to Leinster club championship honours. In 2017, Raheens beat Kilcock to win the Intermediate Championship Final.

Camogie
Geraldine Dwyer, Teresa Lynch, Nuala Malone, Eileen Reilly and Marianne Johnson were selected on the Kildare camogie team of the century in 2000.

Honours Raheens
 Leinster Senior Club Football Championship: Winners 1981
 Kildare Senior Football Championship: Winners (10) 1935, 1936, 1943, 1964, 1968, 1973, 1976, 1978, 1979, 1981
 Kildare Intermediate Football Championship: Winners (2) 1958, 2017
 Kildare Junior Football Championship: Winners (2) 1928, 1974* (1974 Won Junior B Championship and defeated Junior A Championship winners)

Honours Éire Óg
 Kildare Senior Hurling Championship Winners (8) 1964, 1965, 1966, 1967, 1969, 1970, 1971, 1972

Honours Prosperous
 Kildare Senor Camogie Championship (8) 1954, 1972, 1974, 1975, 1976, 1977, 1980, 1981
 Kildare Junior Camogie Championship (1) 1939
 Kildare Senor Camogie League (8) 1974, 1975, 1976, 1977, 1981, 1984, 1985, 1986
 Kildare Senior Football Championship Finalists 1901

Bibliography
 Kildare GAA: A Centenary History, by Eoghan Corry, CLG Chill Dara, 1984,  hb  pb
 Kildare GAA yearbook, 1972, 1974, 1978, 1979, 1980 and 2000- in sequence especially the Millennium yearbook of 2000
 Soaring Sliothars: Centenary of Kildare Camogie 1904-2004 by Joan O'Flynn Kildare County Camogie Board.

External links
Raheens GAA website
Facebook page
Kildare GAA website
Kildare GAA clubs' website
Kildare on Hoganstand.com

Gaelic games clubs in County Kildare
Gaelic football clubs in County Kildare
Hurling clubs in County Kildare
1925 establishments in Ireland